Pavel Vasilievich Yegorov (1889 — 1965)  was a Russian military leader during the war with Ukraine and the forces of Denikin.

Born in 1889 in peasant family, during World War I Yegorov graduated a military college in Lyon, France, in 1915.

In 1917 he joined Bolsheviks and was a member of Moscow Red Guards. In December 1917 Yegorov led his Red Guards to Ukraine along with the Antonov's expeditionary task force in fight with counter-revolution in the South Russia. He played a key role in taken Yekaterinoslav during the Yekaterinoslav Bolshevik Uprising and defeat of the Doroshenko Simferopol Regiment. In the beginning of 1918 his detachment grew into the 1st Revolutionary Army. In March - April 1918 Yegorov headed troops of the Russian Southern Front and later - the Vladikavkaz Military District. From summer of 1918 to spring of 1919 he was placed in charge of forces in combat area around Vladikavkaz to block off movement of the Denikin's troops.

In summer of 1919, Yegorov led the Poltava task force against the mutinied 6th Ukrainian Soviet Division of Nykyfor Hryhoriv and the Denikin's army. Later he commanded a brigade of the 34th Rifle Division in defense of Tsaritsyn and liberation of Sochi. In the fall of 1920 Yegorov was in charge of the 26th brigade of 9th Rifle Division that fought Wrangel troops in the Taurida Governorate.

In 1921 Yegorov moved to the Far Eastern Republic. In 1941-45 he participated in World War II after which lived in Sochi where he died in 1965.

External links
 Pavel Yegorov at the History of Poltava website

1889 births
1965 deaths
Bolsheviks
Russian revolutionaries
Soviet people of the Ukrainian–Soviet War